Emeril Live is a television program that aired on Food Network from October 6, 1997, to December 11, 2007, and then on Fine Living (now The Cooking Channel) from July 7, 2008, to December 14, 2010. Hosted by Emeril Lagasse, Emeril Live featured many of the same elements as Emeril's other program, Essence of Emeril and often had a Creole theme. The program was taped in front of a live audience in New York City and featured music played by Doc Gibbs and the Emeril Live Band. In 2004, the program moved to Chelsea Market. Emeril Live began production in 1997, and won a CableACE Award for "Best Informational Show" later that year. The program featured a wide variety of cuisine from cajun to stir-fry and often featured well-known chefs as guests who cook alongside Emeril. Some of the celebrities that appeared on the program include Charlie Daniels, Patti LaBelle, Michael McDonald, Joe Perry, Sammy Hagar, Aretha Franklin, Patton Oswalt, and Jimmy Buffett.

On November 27, 2007, Food Network revealed it would halt production on the program on December 11, 2007. On May 20, 2008, the Fine Living network announced that it would start airing Emeril Live, including never-before-seen episodes, beginning July 7, 2008. The show ended on December 14, 2010.

External links
Emeril Lagasse's Official Site

References

Food Network original programming
1997 American television series debuts
1990s American cooking television series
2000s American cooking television series
2010 American television series endings